Potassium channel tetramerization domain containing 9 is a protein that in humans is encoded by the KCTD9 gene.

References

Further reading

External links 
 PDBe-KB provides an overview of all the structure information available in the PDB for Human BTB/POZ domain-containing protein KCTD9